Alfredo Petrone (born 26 November 1918) is an Uruguayan boxer who competed in the 1936 Summer Olympics.

In 1936 he was eliminated in the second round of the bantamweight class after losing his fight to the upcoming silver medalist Jack Wilson.

External links
profile
 

1918 births
Possibly living people
Bantamweight boxers
Olympic boxers of Uruguay
Boxers at the 1936 Summer Olympics
Uruguayan sportspeople of Italian descent
Uruguayan male boxers